The Subtle Stone Eater is a statue by Jonás Gutiérrez, installed along Puerto Vallarta's Malecón, in the Mexican state of Jalisco. The  bronze sculpture was installed in January 2006.

See also

 2006 in art

References

External links
 

2006 establishments in Mexico
2006 sculptures
Bronze sculptures in Mexico
Centro, Puerto Vallarta
Outdoor sculptures in Puerto Vallarta
Statues in Jalisco